The  was a permanent Japanese Antarctic transshipment station. Located on Mizuho Plateau 2230 m above sea level, it was opened in 1970. It was operated by the Japanese National Institute of Polar Research, and closed in 1987. It was occasionally visited by some parties for meteorological and glaciological observations.

See also
 List of Antarctic research stations
 List of Antarctic field camps

References

External links
 Japanese National Institute of Polar Research
 みずほ基地

Japanese Antarctic Program
Prince Olav Coast
Outposts of Queen Maud Land
1970 establishments in Antarctica
1987 disestablishments in Antarctica